The North Coast AVA is an American Viticultural Area in the state of California that encompasses grape-growing regions in six counties located north of San Francisco: Lake, Marin, Mendocino, Napa, Sonoma, and Solano.

Appellations

The boundary of the North Coast AVA encompasses many smaller wine appellations, which generally have higher consumer appeal and therefore higher commercial value.  Wine produced primarily from grapes grown in any one of these appellations will likely carry that appellation on its bottle label rather than the North Coast AVA designation.  The North Coast AVA designation is primarily used on bottles of wine created by blending wines from several counties or American Viticultural Areas.

Counties
Because U.S. county names automatically qualify as legal appellations of origin for wine, the following appellations do not require registration with the Alcohol and Tobacco Tax and Trade Bureau:
Lake County
Marin County
Mendocino County
Napa County
Solano County
Sonoma County

Registered American Viticultural Areas (AVAs)
The following American Viticultural Areas are all entirely contained within the boundary of the North Coast AVA:

Alexander Valley AVA
Anderson Valley AVA
Atlas Peak AVA
Big Valley District-Lake County AVA
Benmore Valley AVA
Bennett Valley AVA
Calistoga AVA
Chalk Hill AVA
Chiles Valley AVA
Clear Lake AVA
Cole Ranch AVA
Coombsville AVA
Covelo AVA
Diamond Mountain District AVA
Dos Rios AVA
Dry Creek Valley AVA
Eagle Peak Mendocino County AVA
Fort Ross-Seaview AVA
Fountaingrove District AVA
Green Valley of Russian River Valley AVA

Guenoc Valley AVA
High Valley AVA
Howell Mountain AVA
Kelsey Bench-Lake County AVA
Knights Valley AVA
Los Carneros AVA
McDowell Valley AVA
Mendocino AVA
Mendocino Ridge AVA
Moon Mountain District AVA
Mt. Veeder AVA
Napa Valley AVA
Northern Sonoma AVA
Oak Knoll District of Napa Valley AVA
Oakville AVA
Petaluma Gap AVA
Pine Mountain-Cloverdale Peak AVA
Potter Valley AVA
Red Hills Lake County AVA
Redwood Valley AVA

Rockpile AVA
Russian River Valley AVA
Rutherford AVA
Solano County Green Valley AVA
Sonoma Coast AVA
Sonoma Mountain AVA
Sonoma Valley AVA
Spring Mountain District AVA
St. Helena AVA
Stags Leap District AVA
Suisun Valley AVA
Wild Horse Valley AVA
Yorkville Highlands AVA
Yountville AVA

See also
 Wine Country

References

External links
  TTB AVA Map

American Viticultural Areas

American Viticultural Areas of the San Francisco Bay Area
Northern California
1983 establishments in California